Jet Job  is a 1952 American aviation action film directed by William Beaudine. The film stars Stanley Clements, John Litel and Bob Nichols. Jet Job features stock footage of various types of USAF military aircraft.

Plot
Test pilot Joe Kovak (Stanley Clements) work for Sam Bentley (John Litel), the former partner of Joe's deceased father. Because Joe's father was killed while flying, however, his mother (Dorothy Adams) is afraid for her son. Bentley is competing for an important government contact but Joe is putting the effort into jeopardy as his brash attitude and propensity in disobeying orders, is becoming troublesome. 
Bentley's rival, Oscar Collins (Tom Powers), wants Joe to work for his company, capitalizing on the test pilot's ability to fly high speed aircraft. When Bentley finally is fed up with Joe's defiance, and fires him, Collins gives his public relations manager, Marge Stevens (Elena Verdugo), a $500 bonus to get Joe to sign with his company. Infatuated with Marge, Joe signs on but finds the Collins aircraft is inferior and during a test flight, after being asked to fly too high, their prototype crashes.

Joe escapes unharmed, but before an investigation board, Collins blames Joe for the accident, resulting in Joe's flight license being revoked. When Joe learns about Marge's bonus, he is more determined to prove he can be the best test pilot around, but has to find his way back into the cockpit. Discovering that Bentley has planned a test flight to demonstrate his aircraft to the government, Joe sneaks into the plant and is able to fly the test flight. Government officials award Bentley Aircraft the lucrative contact. Joe gets his licence back and returns to work with Bentley Aircraft, and is able to accept that Marge is in love with him.

Cast

Production

Principal photography for Jet Job began in January 1952. After a stint in Great Britain, director William "One Shot" Beaudine returned to America in 1937 but had trouble re-establishing himself at the major studios. After working at Warner Brothers, Beaudine found work on Poverty Row, working for studios specializing in low-budget films, such as Monogram Pictures and Producers Releasing Corporation. Beaudine became a specialist in comedies, thrillers and melodramas making dozens for these studios. By the 1940s, Beaudine had a reputation for being a resourceful, no-nonsense director who could make feature films in a matter of days, sometimes as few as five.

Producer Ben Schwalb used stock footage of United States Air Force training films, getting approval from Air Force Colonel William C. Lindley for the production. The Lockheed T-33 jet trainer was featured prominently in the film.

Reception
Jet Job was a B film; TV Guide felt the film "... barely gets off the ground."

References
Notes

Citations

Bibliography

 Marshall, Wendy L. William Beaudine: From Silents to Television. Lanham, Maryland: Scarecrow Press, 2005. .
 Paris, Michael. From the Wright Brothers to Top Gun: Aviation, Nationalism, and Popular Cinema. Manchester, UK: Manchester University Press, 1995. .
 Pendo, Stephen. Aviation in the Cinema. Lanham, Maryland: Scarecrow Press, 1985. .

External links
 
 

1952 films
American adventure films
American black-and-white films
1952 adventure films
1950s English-language films
Films directed by William Beaudine
Monogram Pictures films
American aviation films
Films about aviation accidents or incidents
1950s American films